Kriv Stenders is an Australian writer, producer and director best known for the film Red Dog and the thriller film Kill Me Three Times.

He started off directing music videos for many famous Australian bands, including Go Betweens, Mental As Anything, Choirboys, Noiseworks, et al.

The director has won many awards [listed below]. As of 17 November 2011, his movie Red Dog made more than A$21 million at the Australian box office since opening in August 2011. It is ranked eighth in the list of (Cinema of Australia) highest-grossing Australian films of all time. Eleven days after opening, Red Dog became the highest-grossing Australian film of 2011. It has won numerous awards.

Select Credits
Streets Of Your Town - 1988, The Go-Betweens, Music Video
The Illustrated Family Doctor (2005)
Blacktown (2005)
Boxing Day (2007)
Lucky Country (2009)
Red Dog (2011)
Kill Me Three Times (2014)
Red Dog: True Blue (2016)
Australia Day (2017)
Wake in Fright (2017)
Danger Close: The Battle of Long Tan (2019)
Slim and I (2020)

Awards
Australian Academy of Cinema and Television Arts (AACTA) Awards:

AACTA Award [Nominee] (2015)
Best Direction in a Television Drama or Comedy
Episode 1
The Principal (2015)

AACTA Award [Nominee] (2012)
Best Direction
Red Dog (2011)

Australian Directors Guild:

ADG Award [Nominee] (2012)
Best Direction in a Feature Film
Red Dog (2011)

ADG Award [Nominee] (2007)
Best Direction in a Feature Film
Boxing Day (2007)

Australian Film Institute Awards:

AFI Award [Nominee] (2005)
Best Screenplay, Adapted
The Illustrated Family Doctor (2005)

AFI Award [Winner] (1998)
Best Short Fiction Film
Two/Out (1998)

Australian Screen Directors Association:

ASDA Award [Nominee] (2005)
Best Direction of a First Feature Film
The Illustrated Family Doctor (2005)

Berlin International Film Festival:

Crystal Bear [Nominee] (2017)
Generation Kplus - Best Film
Red Dog: True Blue (2016)

Film Critics Circle of Australia Awards:

FCCA Award [Nominee] (2012)
Best Director
Red Dog (2011)

FCCA Award [Nominee] (2005)
Best Screenplay - Adapted
The Illustrated Family Doctor (2005)

Heartland Film Festival:

Grand Prize [Winner] (2017)
Narrative Feature
Red Dog: True Blue (2016)

IF Awards:

IF Award [Winner] (2011)
Best Direction
Red Dog (2011)

IF Award [Winner] (2011)
Best Feature Film
Red Dog (2011)

IF Award [Nominee] (2007)
Best Director
Boxing Day (2007)

Melbourne International Film Festival:

Best Australian Short Film [Winner] (1998)
Two/Out (1998)

Montréal Festival of New Cinema:

Special Mention [Winner] (2007)
Boxing Day (2007)

Rencontres Internationales du Cinéma des Antipodes:

Audience Award [Winner] (2012)
Best Feature Film
Red Dog (2011)

TIFF Kids International Film Festival:

Young People's Jury Award [Winner] (2017)
Best Feature Film (Ages 8–10)
Red Dog: True Blue (2016)

White Sands International Film Festival:

Grand Jury Award [Winner] (2012)
Red Dog (2011)

References

External links

Australian film directors
Australian screenwriters
Australian film producers
Living people
Year of birth missing (living people)